Heteropterus has been used for:

 Heteropterus (butterfly) Duméril, 1806, a genus of butterflies in the family Hesperiidae
 Heteropterus Wang, 1992 (a grasshopper), is a synonym for genus Mongolotettix Rehn, 1928